is a Japanese footballer who plays for AC Nagano Parceiro. He is a defender.

Career
He was educated at and played for  Osaka University of Health and Sport sciences before moving to Singapore in 2017. He is currently playing for J2 League, Ventforet Kofu.

Club career statistics
As of end of 2 Oct 2022.

References

External links

Profile at Ventforet Kofu

1994 births
Living people
People from Toyota, Aichi
Japanese footballers
Association football people from Aichi Prefecture
Singapore Premier League players
Albirex Niigata Singapore FC players
J2 League players
J3 League players
Ventforet Kofu players
Tokushima Vortis players
AC Nagano Parceiro players
Association football forwards